Eupterote placida is a moth in the family Eupterotidae. It was described by Frederic Moore in 1883. It is found in Sri Lanka. The Global Lepidoptera Names Index has this name as a synonym of Eupterote hibisci.

Adults are pale ochreous brown, the forewings with a transverse submarginal indistinct brown line, externally to which is a row of indistinct brown-specked spots. The hindwings have a similar indistinct brown line and outer spots.

References

Moths described in 1883
Eupterotinae